N. Ravichandran is an Indian business magnate, investor and philanthropist. He is the founder  and chairman of TVH (True Value Homes) group, an Indian conglomerate with presence in real estate, energy and construction.

Early life and education
Ravichandran grew up in Trichy and later moved to Chennai. He is a civil engineer and he obtained his OPM from Harvard Business School in the United States.

Career
In 1997, Ravichandran founded True Value Homes (TVH). TVH has offices in Chennai, Trichy, Coimbatore and Kochin. By 2013, TVH had developed six million sq.ft cumulatively in both commercial and residential space.

Honours and awards
Reality Plus – Luxuary project of the year 2012
Reality Plus – Environmental friendly project of the year 2012
Best affordable housing of the year 2012 & 2013 awarded by NDTV Profit
CNBC Real Estate Award for BEST 100%  completed ultra luxury residential
Best concrete structure award for the year 2011 recognised by the Tamil Nadu Government

Philanthropy
Ravichandran, through TVH, helped  organise Medical camps in economically backward villages, and day care facilities for the children. He also organized Creche's and schools at each site to educate the children of contract labourers
He proactively donates to Udavum Karangal, a charity for orphans and the destitute and to other such charities.
Under his stewardship, TVH has  adopted more than 700 orphan children from the Indian Council of Child Welfare
Ravichandran is also actively working to create awareness about the importance of educating the Girl child.

References

Businesspeople from Chennai
Living people
Harvard Business School alumni
Indian real estate businesspeople
Year of birth missing (living people)